Perstructuranenteria is a genus of mites in the family Nenteriidae.

Species
 Perstructuranenteria crateriformis (Hirschmann, 1985)     
 Perstructuranenteria fici (Hirschmann, 1978)     
 Perstructuranenteria perstructura (Hirschmann, 1985)     
 Perstructuranenteria robusta (Hiramatsu, 1981)     
 Perstructuranenteria superstructura (Hirschmann, 1985)     
 Perstructuranenteria triacuta (Hirschmann, 1985)

References

Mesostigmata
Acari genera